Ulica Miła 18 (or 18 Pleasant Street in English) was the headquarters "bunker" (actually a hidden shelter) of the Jewish Combat Organization (ŻOB), a Jewish resistance group in the Warsaw Ghetto in Poland during World War II.

History

The bunker at Miła 18 was constructed by a group of underworld smugglers in 1943. The ŻOB fighters arrived there after their own hideout, at 29 Miła Street, had been discovered. The smugglers who had built it were helping the ŻOB as guides.

From the Stroop Report 7 May 1943:

From the Stroop Report 8 May 1943:

On 8 May 1943, three weeks after the start of the Warsaw Ghetto Uprising, when the bunker was found out by the Nazis, there were around 300 people inside. The smugglers surrendered, but the ŻOB command, including Mordechaj Anielewicz, the leader of the uprising, stood firm. The Nazis threw tear gas into the shelter to force the occupants out. Anielewicz, his girlfriend Mira Fuchrer and many of his staff committed mass suicide by ingesting poison rather than surrender, though a few fighters who did neither managed to get out of a rear exit and later fled from the ghetto through the canals to the "Aryan side" at Prosta Street on May 10.

Remembrance

In July 1945 survivors of the Jewish Underground (Among them Simcha Rotem) visited the ruins above the Command bunker.  The bodies of Jewish fighters were not exhumed after 1945 and the place gained the status of war memorial.

In 1946, the monument known as Anielewicz Mound, made of the rubble of Miła houses, was erected. A commemorative stone with the inscription in Polish and Yiddish was placed on top of the mound.

In 2006, a new obelisk designed by Hanna Szmalenberg and Marek Moderau was added to the memorial. The inscription in Polish, English and Yiddish reads: 
 The names of 51 Jewish fighters whose identities have been established by historians are engraved on the front of the obelisk.

Although it is often claimed that Miła 18 was the last shelter in the Ghetto to fall, this was not the case (according to Jürgen Stroop, his men took 30 "bunkers" on 12 May alone). It should be also noted that the current street numbering in Mila Street does not correspond to the wartime numbering: the memorial is nowadays at the intersection of Miła and Dubois streets while the current Miła 18 is an apartment block around 700 metres to the west.

Jewish fighters who died at Miła 18

 Chaim Akerman
 Małka Alterman
 Mordechaj Anielewicz
 Nate Bartmeser
 Heniek Bartowicz
 Franka Berman
 Tosia Berman
 Icchak Blaustein
 Melach Błones
 Berl Braude
 Icchak Chadasz
 Nesia Cukier
 Icchak Dembiński
 Józef Fass
 Efraim Fondamiński
 Towa Frenkel
 Emus Frojnd
 Mira Fuchrer
 Wolf Gold
 Miriam Hajnsdorf
 Aron Halzband
 Rut Hejman
 Mira Izbicka
 Salke Kamień
 Ziuta Klejnman
 Jaffa Lewender
 Lolek (first name only)
 Sewek Nulman
 Abraham Orwacz
 Rywka Pasamonik
 Majloch Perelman
 Aron Rajzband
 Lutek Rotblat
 Miriam Rotblat
 Jardena Rozenberg
 Salka (first name only)
 Jerzy Sarnak
 Szmuel Sobol
 Basia Sylman
 Szyja Szpancer
 Moniek Sztengel
 Szulamit Szuszkowska
 Mojsze Waksfeld
 Olek Wartowicz
 Icchak Wichter
 Arie Wilner
 Zeew Wortman
 Hirsz Wroński
 Rachelka Zylberberg
 Moszek Zylbertszajn
 Sara Żagiel

References

Warsaw Ghetto Uprising
Buildings and structures in Warsaw
History of Warsaw
Infrastructure completed in 1943
Jewish resistance during the Holocaust
Jewish Polish history
Mass suicides
Monuments and memorials in Warsaw
Tourist attractions in Warsaw